The Little Mermaid is a 1989 American animated musical fantasy film produced by Walt Disney Feature Animation and released by Walt Disney Pictures. The 28th Disney animated feature film, it is loosely based on the 1837 Danish fairy tale of the same name by Hans Christian Andersen. The film was written and directed by John Musker and Ron Clements and produced by Musker and Howard Ashman, who also wrote the film's songs with Alan Menken. Menken also composed the film's score. Featuring the voices of Jodi Benson, Christopher Daniel Barnes, Pat Carroll, Samuel E. Wright, Jason Marin, Kenneth Mars, and Buddy Hackett, The Little Mermaid tells the story of a teenage mermaid princess named Ariel, who dreams of becoming human and falls in love with a human prince named Eric, which leads her to make a magic deal with the sea witch, Ursula, to become human and be with him.

Walt Disney planned to put the story in a proposed package film containing Andersen's stories, but scrapped the project. In 1985, while working on The Great Mouse Detective (1986), Clements and Musker decided to adapt the fairy tale and proposed it to Disney Studios chairman Jeffrey Katzenberg, who initially declined due to its similarities to a proposed sequel to the 1984 film Splash, but ultimately approved of it. Ashman became involved and brought in Menken. With supervision from Katzenberg, they made a Broadway-style structure with musical numbers as the staff was working on Oliver & Company (1988). Katzenberg warned that the film would earn less since it appealed to females, but he eventually became convinced that it would be Disney's first blockbuster hit.

The Little Mermaid was released to theaters on November 17, 1989, to critical acclaim, earning praise for the animation, music, and characters. Along with the major success of both the 1986 Disney animated film The Great Mouse Detective and the 1988 Disney/Amblin live-action/animated film Who Framed Roger Rabbit, The Little Mermaid is given credit for breathing life back into the art of Disney animated feature films after some films produced by Disney were struggling. It also marked the start of the era known as the Disney Renaissance. The film won two Academy Awards for Best Original Score and Best Original Song ("Under the Sea").

The film's success led to a media franchise. A direct-to-video sequel was released in 2000, focusing on Ariel's daughter, Melody. A prequel followed in 2008. The first film was adapted into a stage musical with a book by Doug Wright and additional songs by Alan Menken and new lyricist Glenn Slater opened in Denver in July 2007 and began performances on Broadway January 10, 2008 starring Sierra Boggess. 

Other derived works and material inspired by the film, include a live-action film adaptation, directed by Rob Marshall, currently scheduled for release in 2023, and a 2019 live musical presentation of the film aired on ABC as part of The Wonderful World of Disney.

In 2022, the film was selected for preservation in the United States National Film Registry by the Library of Congress as being "culturally, historically, or aesthetically significant".

Plot

In the kingdom of Atlantica, located under the Atlantic Ocean, Ariel, a 16-year old mermaid princess, is dissatisfied with her underwater life, but is fascinated by the human world. With her best friend Flounder, Ariel visits Scuttle, a seagull who gives Ariel inaccurate information about humans, and collects human artifacts in her grotto. She ignores the warnings of her father King Triton, the ruler of Atlantica, that contact between merpeople and humans is forbidden. One night, Ariel, Flounder, and Sebastian, a crab who serves as Triton's adviser and court composer, travel to the ocean surface to watch a birthday celebration for Prince Eric. Ariel falls in love with Eric at first sight. Suddenly a violent storm arrives, wrecking the ship, and knocking Eric overboard. Ariel rescues Eric and brings him to shore. She sings to him, but leaves just as he regains consciousness to avoid being discovered. Fascinated by the memory of her voice, Eric vows to find the girl who saved and sang to him, and Ariel vows to find a way to join him in his world. Discovering a change in Ariel's behavior, Triton questions Sebastian about her behavior and learns of her love for Eric. An outraged Triton travels to Ariel's grotto and destroys her collection of artifacts in a misguided attempt to protect her. After a remorseful Triton leaves, two blue eels named Flotsam and Jetsam convince Ariel to visit Ursula the sea witch, who plans to use Ariel as ransom to get Triton's magical trident.

Ursula makes a deal with Ariel to transform her into a human for three days in exchange for Ariel's voice, which Ursula puts in a nautilus shell. Within these three days, Ariel must receive "True love's kiss" from Eric. If Ariel gets Eric to kiss her, she will remain a human permanently. Otherwise, she will transform back into a mermaid and belong to Ursula. Ariel accepts and is then given human legs and taken to the surface by Flounder and Sebastian. Eric finds Ariel on the beach and takes her to his castle, unaware that she is the one who had rescued him earlier. Ariel spends time with Eric, and at the end of the second day, they almost kiss but are thwarted by Flotsam and Jetsam. Furious at Ariel's close success, Ursula disguises herself as a young woman named Vanessa and appears onshore singing with Ariel's voice. Eric recognizes the song, and Ursula, transformed in Vanessa, casts a hypnotic enchantment on Eric to make him forget about Ariel.

The next day, Ariel discovers that Eric will be married to Vanessa. Scuttle discovers Vanessa's true identity and informs Ariel, who immediately pursues the wedding barge. Sebastian informs Triton, and Scuttle disrupts the wedding with the help of various sea animals. In the chaos, the nautilus shell around Ursula's neck is destroyed, restoring Ariel's voice and breaking Ursula's enchantment over Eric. Realizing that Ariel is the girl who saved his life, Eric rushes to kiss her, but the sun sets and Ariel transforms back into a mermaid and Vanessa transforms back into her true form of Ursula. Ursula then kidnaps Ariel. Triton confronts Ursula and demands Ariel's release, but the deal is inviolable. At Ursula's urging, Triton agrees to take Ariel's place as Ursula's prisoner, giving up his trident. Ariel is released as Triton transforms into a polyp and loses his authority over Atlantica. Ursula declares herself the Queen of the Seven Seas, but before she can use the trident, Eric intervenes with a harpoon. Ursula attempts to kill Eric, but Ariel intervenes, causing Ursula to inadvertently kill Flotsam and Jetsam. Enraged, Ursula uses the trident to grow to a monstrous size.

Ariel and Eric reunite on the surface just before a gigantic Ursula separates them. She then gains full control of the entire ocean, creating a storm and bringing sunken ships to the surface. Just as Ursula is about to kill Ariel, Eric commandeers a wrecked ship and kills Ursula by impaling her in the abdomen with its splintered bowsprit. With Ursula dead, Triton and the other polyps in Ursula's garden revert to their original forms. Realizing that Ariel truly loves Eric, Triton willingly changes her from a mermaid into a human permanently and approves her marriage to Eric. Ariel and Eric marry on a ship and depart, with all of Ariel's friends and family watching them as well.

Voice cast

 Jodi Benson as Ariel, the 16-year-old mermaid princess of Atlantica who is fascinated with humans, especially Prince Eric.
 Benson also voices Vanessa, Ursula's human alter-ego and disguise.
 Christopher Daniel Barnes as Prince Eric, a human prince who is saved by Ariel and is determined to find and marry her.
 Pat Carroll as Ursula, a sea witch who takes Ariel's voice in exchange for turning her into a human, planning to use Ariel as ransom to get her father's magical trident.
 Kenneth Mars as King Triton, Ariel's father and the ruler of Atlantica who is prejudiced towards humans.
 Samuel E. Wright as Sebastian, a red Caribbean crab who serves as King Triton's advisor and court composer.
 Jason Marin as Flounder, Ariel's yellow tropical fish best friend.
 Buddy Hackett as Scuttle, a seagull who shares Ariel's fascination with humans and teaches her about "human stuff."
 Paddi Edwards as Flotsam and Jetsam, Ursula's symbiotic and insidious pet green moray eels.
 Ben Wright as Sir Grimsby, Eric's loyal steward. Wright had played characters in previous Disney films like Roger Radcliffe in One Hundred and One Dalmatians and Rama in The Jungle Book. This was his last role; he died four months before its release.
 Edie McClurg as Carlotta, Eric's maid.
 Will Ryan as Harold, a seahorse and Triton's herald.
 René Auberjonois as Chef Louis, Eric's mad chef who attempts to cook Sebastian, but fails.

Production

Writing

The Little Mermaid was originally planned as part of one of Walt Disney's earliest feature films, a proposed package film featuring vignettes of Hans Christian Andersen tales. Development started soon after Snow White and the Seven Dwarfs in the late 1930s, but was delayed due to various circumstances.

In 1985, Ron Clements became interested in a film adaptation of The Little Mermaid while he was serving as a director on The Great Mouse Detective (1986) alongside John Musker. Clements discovered the Hans Christian Andersen fairy tale while browsing through a bookstore. Believing the story provided an "ideal basis" for an animated feature film and keen on creating a film that took place underwater, Clements wrote and presented a two-page treatment of The Little Mermaid at Walt Disney Studios to chief Jeffrey Katzenberg at a "gong show" idea suggestion meeting. Katzenberg passed the project over, because at that time the studio was in development on a sequel to their live-action mermaid comedy Splash (1984) and felt The Little Mermaid would be too similar a project. The next day, however, Katzenberg approved of the idea for possible development, along with Oliver & Company. While in production in the 1980s, the staff found, by chance, original story and visual development work done by Kay Nielsen for Disney's proposed 1930s Andersen feature. Many of the changes made by the staff in the 1930s to Hans Christian Andersen's original story were coincidentally the same as the changes made by Disney writers in the 1980s.

That year, Clements and Musker expanded the two-page idea into a 20-page rough script, eliminating the role of the mermaid's grandmother and expanding the roles of the Merman King and the sea witch. However, the film's plans were momentarily shelved as Disney focused its attention on Who Framed Roger Rabbit and Oliver & Company as more immediate releases. In 1987, songwriter Howard Ashman became involved with the writing and development of The Little Mermaid after he was asked to contribute a song to Oliver & Company. He proposed changing the minor character Clarence, the English-butler crab, to a Jamaican crab and shifting the music style throughout the film to reflect this. At the same time, Katzenberg, Clements, Musker, and Ashman revised the story format to make The Little Mermaid a musical with a Broadway-style story structure, with the song sequences serving as the tentpoles of the film. Ashman and composer Alan Menken, both noted for their work as the writers of the successful Off-Broadway stage musical Little Shop of Horrors, teamed up to compose the entire song score. In 1988, with Oliver & Company out of the way, The Little Mermaid was slated as the next major Disney release.

Animation
More money and resources were dedicated to The Little Mermaid than any other Disney animated film in decades. Aside from its main animation facility in Glendale, California, Disney opened a satellite feature animation facility during the production of The Little Mermaid in Lake Buena Vista, Florida (near Orlando, Florida), within Disney-MGM Studios Theme Park at Walt Disney World. Opening in 1989, the Disney-MGM facility's first projects were to produce an entire Roger Rabbit cartoon short, Roller Coaster Rabbit, and to contribute ink and paint support to The Little Mermaid. Another first for recent years was the filming of live actors and actresses for motion reference material for the animators, a practice used frequently for many of the Disney animated features produced under Walt Disney's supervision. Sherri Lynn Stoner, a former member of Los Angeles' Groundlings improvisation comedy group, and Joshua Finkel, a Broadway actor, performed key scenes as Ariel and Eric respectively. Jodi Benson had already been cast as Ariel's voice actor by this time, and her recorded dialogue was used as playback to guide these live-action references. Before Benson was cast, Melissa Fahn was considered for the part.

The Little Mermaid supervising animators included Glen Keane and Mark Henn on Ariel, Duncan Marjoribanks on Sebastian, Andreas Deja on King Triton, and Ruben Aquino on Ursula. Originally, Keane had been asked to work on Ursula, as he had established a reputation for drawing large, powerful figures, such as the bear in The Fox and the Hound (1981) and Professor Ratigan in The Great Mouse Detective (1986). Keane, however, was assigned as one of the two lead artists on the petite Ariel and oversaw the "Part of Your World" musical number. He jokingly stated that his wife looks exactly like Ariel "without the fins." The character's body type and personality were based upon those of Alyssa Milano, then starring on TV's Who's the Boss? and the effect of her hair underwater was based on both footage of Sally Ride when she was in space, and scenes of Stoner in a pool for guidance in animating Ariel's swimming.

The underwater setting required the most special effects animation for a Disney animated feature since Fantasia in 1940. Effects animation supervisor Mark Dindal estimated that over a million bubbles were drawn for this film, in addition to the use of other processes such as airbrushing, backlighting, superimposition, and some computer animation. The artistic manpower needed for The Little Mermaid required Disney to farm out most of the underwater bubble effects animation in the film to Pacific Rim Productions, a China-based firm with production facilities in Beijing. An attempt to use Disney's famed multiplane camera for the first time in years for quality "depth" shots failed because the machine was reputedly in dilapidated condition. The multiplane shots were instead photographed at an outside animation camera facility.

The Little Mermaid was the last Disney feature film in the canon to use the traditional hand-painted cel method of animation (the Disneytoon Studios film DuckTales the Movie also used cels), as well as the last Disney traditionally cel animated feature film directed by Clements and Musker. Disney's next film, The Rescuers Down Under, used a digital method of coloring and combining scanned drawings developed for Disney by Pixar called CAPS/ink & paint (Computer Animation Production System), which would eliminate the need for cels, the multiplane camera, and many of the optical effects used for the last time in The Little Mermaid. Clements and Musker's next film, Aladdin, also used digital coloring via CAPS. A CAPS/ink & paint prototype was used experimentally on a few scenes in The Little Mermaid, and one shot produced using CAPS/ink & paint—the penultimate shot in the film, of Ariel and Eric's wedding ship sailing away under a rainbow—appears in the finished film. Computer-generated imagery was used to create some of the wrecked ships in the final battle, a staircase behind a shot of Ariel in Eric's castle, and the carriage Eric and Ariel are riding in when she bounces it over a ravine. These objects were animated using 3D wireframe models, which were plotted as line art to cels and painted traditionally. The film being both the first film of the Disney Renaissance and the last to use the xerography technology used since 1961 with One Hundred and One Dalmatians made it somewhat of a transitional film between the two Disney eras.

Casting
The design of the villainous Ursula was based upon drag performer Divine. An additional early inspiration before Divine was Joan Collins in her role as Alexis Carrington in the television series Dynasty, due to a suggestion from Howard Ashman, who was a fan of the series. Pat Carroll was not Clements and Musker's first choice to voice Ursula; the original script had been written with Bea Arthur of the Disney-owned TV series The Golden Girls in mind. After Arthur turned the part down, actresses such as Nancy Marchand, Nancy Wilson, Roseanne, Charlotte Rae, Jennifer Saunders and Elaine Stritch were considered for the part. Stritch was eventually cast as Ursula, but clashed with Howard Ashman's style of music production and was replaced by Carroll. Various actors auditioned for additional roles in the film, including Jim Carrey for the role of Prince Eric, and comedians Bill Maher and Michael Richards for the role of Scuttle.

Music

The Little Mermaid was considered by some as "the film that brought Broadway into cartoons". Alan Menken wrote the Oscar-winning score, and collaborated with Howard Ashman on the songs. One of the film's most prominent songs, "Part of Your World," was nearly cut from the film when it seemingly tested poorly with children, who became rowdy during the scene. This caused Jeffrey Katzenberg to feel that the song needed to be cut, an idea that was resisted by Musker, Clements and Keane. Both Musker and Clements cited the similar situation of the song "Over the Rainbow" nearly being cut from 1939's The Wizard of Oz when it was appealing to Katzenberg. Keane pushed for the song to remain until the film was in a more finalized state. During a second test screening, the scene, now colorized and further developed, tested well with a separate child audience, and the musical number was kept.

Release
The film was originally released on November 17, 1989, followed by a re-release on November 14, 1997. After the success of the 3D re-release of The Lion King, Disney announced a 3D re-release of The Little Mermaid scheduled for September 13, 2013, but this was cancelled on January 14, 2013, due to the under-performances of other Disney 3D re-releases until further notice. The 3D version was released on Blu-ray instead, but it did play a limited engagement at the El Capitan Theatre from September to October 2013. On September 20, 2013, The Little Mermaid began playing in select theaters where audiences could bring iPads and use an app called Second Screen Live. AMC Theatres screened the movie from September 6–12, 2019. The film was also screened out of competition at the 1990 Cannes Film Festival.

Home media
In a then-atypical and controversial move for a new Disney animated film, The Little Mermaid was released as part of the Walt Disney Classics line of VHS, LaserDisc, Betamax and Video 8 home media releases on May 18, 1990, six months after the release of the film. Before The Little Mermaid, only a select number of Disney's catalog animated films had been released to home media, as the company was afraid of upsetting its profitable practice of theatrically reissuing each film every few years. The Little Mermaid became that year's top-selling title on home video, with over 10 million units sold (including 7 million in its first month) and 13 million units by October 1993. This success led to future Disney animated films being released on home video soon after the end of their theatrical runs, rather than delayed for several years, making The Little Mermaid the first Disney animated feature to be released on home video 1 year after its theatrical release.

Following The Little Mermaids November 14, 1997 re-release in theaters, a new VHS version was released on March 31, 1998, as part of the Walt Disney Masterpiece Collection and included a bonus music video of Jodi Benson singing "Part of Your World" during the end credits, replacing "Under the Sea" as the end credits song. The VHS sold 13 million units and ranked as the third best-selling video of the year.

The Little Mermaid was released in a "bare-bones"  Walt Disney Limited Issue DVD on December 7, 1999, with a standard video transfer. The film was re-released on DVD on October 3, 2006, as part of the Walt Disney Platinum Editions of features, alongside the music video for the cover version of "Kiss The Girl" performed by Ashley Tisdale. Deleted scenes and several in-depth documentaries were included, as well as an Academy Award-nominated short film intended for the shelved Fantasia 2006, The Little Matchgirl. The DVD sold 1.6 million units on its first day of release, and over 4 million units during its first week, making it the biggest animated DVD debut for October. By the year's end, the DVD had sold about 7 million units and was one of the year's top 10 selling DVDs. The Walt Disney Platinum Edition DVD was released as part of a "Little Mermaid Trilogy" boxed set on December 16, 2008. The Walt Disney Platinum Edition of the film, along with its sequels, went on moratorium in January 2009. The film was re-released on a 3-disc Blu-ray/DVD/Digital Copy combo, a 2-disc Blu-ray/DVD combo and 3D Blu-ray on October 1, 2013, as part of the Walt Disney Diamond Edition line. The Little Mermaid was re-released on HD and 4K digital download on February 12, 2019, with a physical media re-release on Blu-ray and Ultra HD Blu-ray on February 26, 2019, as part of the Walt Disney Signature Collection of the film's 30th anniversary.

A sing-along version of the film was released on Disney+ July 22, 2022.

Live presentations
In June 2016, Disney held special presentations of the film at the Hollywood Bowl in Los Angeles, titled The Little Mermaid in Concert. The performances combined a screening of The Little Mermaid with live accompaniment by guest musicians and celebrities, including Sara Bareilles (who performed as Ariel), Tituss Burgess (who performed as Sebastian as a reprisal of his role in the stage adaptation), Darren Criss (who performed as Prince Eric), Rebel Wilson (who performed as Ursula), Joshua Colley (who performed as Flounder), John Stamos (who performed as Chef Louis) and Norm Lewis (who performed as King Triton as a reprisal of his role in the stage adaptation). The four additional songs written for the stage adaptation were also incorporated into the presentation, accompanied by scenes of the film's original concept art. During the third and final performance, Jodi Benson replaced Bareilles to reprise her original role as Ariel, while Brad Kane (the singing voice of the title character of Aladdin) and Susan Egan (who played Belle in the stage adaptation of Beauty and the Beast) also made special appearances, singing songs from their respective films, and a duet of "A Whole New World".

From May 17–18, 2019, the Hollywood Bowl hosted another live presentation, titled The Little Mermaid:  An Immersive Live-to Film Concert Experience. These performances once again combined a screening of the film with live renditions of the film's songs, this time starring Lea Michele as Ariel, Harvey Fierstein as Ursula, Cheech Marin as Chef Louis, Ken Page as Sebastian, Peter Gallagher as King Triton, Leo Gallo as Prince Eric, Joshua Turchin as Flounder, and an uncredited actor as Scuttle. This presentation utilized the some songs written for the screen adaptation and some from the stage adaptation, including Joshua Turchin singing "She's in Love" from the Broadway adaptation, The Little Mermaid.

Reception

Box office
Early in the production of The Little Mermaid, Jeffrey Katzenberg cautioned Clements, Musker, and their staff, telling them that since The Little Mermaid was a "girl's film", it would make less money at the box office than Oliver & Company, which had been Disney's biggest animated box office success in a decade. However, by the time the film was closer to completion, Katzenberg was convinced The Little Mermaid would be a hit and the first animated feature to earn more than $100 million in its initial run and become a "blockbuster" film.

During its original 1989 theatrical release, The Little Mermaid made $6.1 million in its opening weekend, ranking in third place behind Harlem Nights and Look Who's Talking. Throughout this run, it earned $84.4 million at the North American box office, falling short of Katzenberg's expectations but earning 64% more than Oliver & Company and becoming the animated film with the highest gross from its initial run. The film was theatrically reissued on November 14, 1997, on the same day as Anastasia, a Don Bluth animated feature for Fox Animation Studios. For this release, it ranked in third place behind The Jackal and Starship Troopers, collecting $9.8 million during its first weekend. The reissue brought $27.2 million in additional gross.

Critical reception
The site's consensus reads "The Little Mermaid ushered in a new golden era for Disney animation with warm and charming hand-drawn characters and catchy musical sequences." On Metacritic, the film has a weighted average score of 88 out of 100 based on 24 critics, indicating "universal acclaim".

Roger Ebert of the Chicago Sun-Times was enthusiastic about the film, writing, "The Little Mermaid is a jolly and inventive animated fantasy—a movie that's so creative and so much fun it deserves comparison with the best Disney work of the past." Ebert also commented positively on the character of Ariel, stating she "is a fully realized female character who thinks and acts independently, even rebelliously, instead of hanging around passively while the fates decide her destiny." Gene Siskel of the Chicago Tribune wrote, "While the story won't win any prizes from the women's liberation movement, the animation is so full and colorful and the songs so beguiling that this is a case of where someone made one like they used to. The drawing of the evil octopus witch who is jealous of the mermaid's singing voice is particularly outstanding." Janet Maslin of The New York Times praised the film as a "marvel of skillful animation, witty songwriting and smart planning. It is designed to delight filmgoers of every conceivable stripe... Adults will be charmed by the film's bright, outstandingly pretty look and by its robust score. Small children will be enchanted by the film's sunniness and by its perfect simplicity."

Variety magazine praised the film for its cast of characters, Ursula in particular, as well as its animation, stating that the animation "proves lush and fluid, augmented by the use of shadow and light as elements like fire, sun and water illuminate the characters." They also praised the musical collaboration between Howard Ashman and Alan Menken "whose songs frequently begin slowly but build in cleverness and intensity." During the film's 1997 re-release, Hal Hinson of The Washington Post wrote a mixed review, referring to it as a "likably unspectacular adaptation of the Hans Christian Andersen classic."

The staff of TV Guide wrote a positive review, praising the film's return to the traditional Disney musical as well as the film's animation. Yet they also wrote that the film is detracted from by the juvenile humor and the human characters' eyes. While still giving a positive review, they stated that the film "can't compare to the real Disney classics (which appealed equally to both kids and adults)." Todd Gilchrist of IGN wrote a positive review of the film, stating that the film is "an almost perfect achievement." Gilchrist also praised how the film revived interest in animation as it was released at a time when interest in animation was at a lull. Empire gave a positive review of the film, stating that "[The Little Mermaid is] a charmer of a movie, boasting all the ingredients that make a Disney experience something to treasure yet free of all the politically correct, formulaic elements that have bogged down the more recent productions."

In April 2008 – 19 years after the film's initial release in 1989 – Yahoo! users voted The Little Mermaid as No. 14 on the top 30 animated films of all time. In June, that same year, the film remained on the list but dropped six slots to end at #20. (Only three other traditionally animated Disney animated films - Aladdin, Beauty and the Beast, and The Lion King, respectively - scored above it in the poll even after the update.) In 2011, Richard Corliss of Time magazine named it one of "The 25 All-TIME Best Animated Films".

Accolades
The film earned three Academy Award nominations, making it the first Disney animated film to earn nominations since The Rescuers in 1977.

Bolstered by the film's success and the soundtrack's award wins, it was certified double platinum by the Recording Industry Association of America in September 1990 for shipments of two million copies of the soundtrack album, an unheard of feat for an animated film at the time. To date, the soundtrack has been certified six times platinum.

The film is recognized by American Film Institute in these lists:
 2002: AFI's 100 Years...100 Passions – Nominated
 2003: AFI's 100 Years...100 Heroes & Villains:
 Ursula – Nominated Villain
 2004: AFI's 100 Years...100 Songs:
 "Under the Sea" – Nominated
 2006: AFI's Greatest Movie Musicals – Nominated
 2008: AFI's 10 Top 10:
 Nominated Animation Film

Controversy

Sexual interpretations of artwork and lawsuits
Controversy arose regarding the artwork for the film's original VHS release when consumers noticed an oddly shaped structure on the castle, closely resembling a human penis. Disney and the cover designer insist it was an accident, resulting from a late night rush job to finish the cover artwork. The object does not appear on the cover of the second release of the movie.

Another allegation is that the clergyman presiding over the wedding between Eric and Ursula (the latter disguised as Vanessa) is seen to have an erection. The object in question is actually the short, stubby-legged man's knee.

The combined incidents led an Arkansas woman to file suit against The Walt Disney Company in 1995, though she dropped the suit two months later.

Retrospectives on the depiction of consent and empowerment
In 2018, an all-male Princeton a capella choir, the Tigertones, was criticized for using the song Kiss the Girl, and in particular the way their performance played into the lyrics. The film depicts a mute female character in a romantic setting with a male character, while the lyrics encourage him to kiss her. The Tigertones would bring on stage two unsuspecting members of the audience, one man and one woman, and encouraged them to kiss. Critics have raised issues of informed consent being at stake, as well as toxic masculinity. Comparisons were also drawn to other Disney animated films that provoked similar arguments, such as Snow White and the Seven Dwarves, wherein the prince kisses an unconscious Snow White. Some Princeton students told The New York Times that the lyrics were not troubling, but the Tigertones choosing people at random was.

Also in 2018, actor Keira Knightly said she would not permit her 3-year-old to watch Disney films, including Cinderella and The Little Mermaid, saying, "This is the one that I'm quite annoyed about, because I really like the film, but Little Mermaid, I mean, the songs are great, but do not give your voice up for a man. Hello."

Actor, comedian, and writer Mindy Kaling expressed similar sentiments:The Little Mermaid is a little problematic to me. I love the songs, I love the crab, Ursula the Sea Witch is a great character, but it bums me out looking back on it because she gave up her voice and left her family and friends in pursuit of a man. And she's 16 years old. When my daughter and I watch it together and she gets older, I'll still let her watch it, but I'll have to do the running commentary of like, 'You don't have to be mute to attract a man and get all your dreams to come true. It's fine! The people in your life who are your enemies are not just an older woman who's jealous of your beauty. The ultimate dream in life is not to become married to a white prince.'

Legacy
The Little Mermaid, which was Disney's first animated fairy tale since Sleeping Beauty (1959), is an important film in animation history for many reasons. It was instrumental in re-establishing feature-length animation as a profitable venture for the Walt Disney Company, as the company's theme parks, television productions, and live-action features had overshadowed the animated output since the 1950s. The Little Mermaid was the second film, following Oliver & Company, produced after Disney began expanding its animated output following its successful live action/animated film Who Framed Roger Rabbit, and became Disney's first animated major box office and critical hit since The Rescuers in 1977. Walt Disney Feature Animation was further expanded as a result of The Little Mermaid and increasingly successful follow-ups – Beauty and the Beast (1991), Aladdin (1992), and The Lion King (1994). The staff increased from 300 members in 1988 to 2,200 in 1999 spread across three studios in Burbank, California, Lake Buena Vista, Florida, and Montreuil, Seine-Saint-Denis, France.

In addition, The Little Mermaid signaled the re-establishment of the musical film format as a standard for Disney animated films. The majority of Disney's most popular animated films from the 1930s on had been musicals, though by the 1970s and 1980s the role of music had been de-emphasized in the films. 1988's Oliver & Company had served as a test of sorts to the success of the musical format before Disney committed to the Broadway-style structure of The Little Mermaid.

In 2022, the film was selected for preservation in the United States National Film Registry by the Library of Congress as being "culturally, historically, or aesthetically significant".

Theme parks
Ariel is a meet-and-greet character appearing at Disney theme parks around the world, including in specific meet-and-greet locations such as Ariel's Grotto. A dark ride based on the film, Ariel's Undersea Adventure, opened at both Disney California Adventure at the Disneyland Resort and Magic Kingdom at Walt Disney World in 2011 and 2012, respectively. Both attractions tell the story of the film by taking riders through scenes based on the film's various musical numbers. Various live entertainment shows based on the film can be found at Disney theme parks worldwide, including Voyage of the Little Mermaid at Disney's Hollywood Studios and King Triton's Concert at Tokyo DisneySea. The Mermaid Lagoon land at Tokyo DisneySea is also based on the film.

Allegory for expression of identity
Dr. Michael Landis, a history teacher at State University of New York, Ulster, writing for Smithsonian Magazine in 2019, says the film "sent important messages about identity to its young audiences," including topics of gay rights (the central character, Ariel, "feels constrained by her patriarchal society" and is "in the closet"), gender fluidity, and body image issues. Ariel turns to "the only strong female in the entire film and thus Ariel’s only female role model," the villain Ursula (who was based on famous drag queen Divine, herself closely associated with gay filmmaker John Waters). Landis invokes Laura Sells and her argument that, "Ariel learns [from Ursula that] gender [is not]...a natural category, but...a performed construct.” He adds:In short, Ursula represents feminism, the fluidity of gender, and young Ariel’s empowerment. Ariel can be anything she wants, yet she chooses the role of young bride and human conformity. To ensure Ariel’s transition to domesticity, the men of her life murder Ursula with a “conveniently phallic” symbol, according to Patrick D. Murphy: or, as Sells puts it, “the ritual slaughtering of the archetypal evil feminine character.” Either way, the movie implicitly offers a dark and disturbing message about the limits of American society in the late 1980s.

Sequel and prequel
A direct-to-video sequel, titled The Little Mermaid II: Return to the Sea, was released on September 19, 2000. The plot focuses on Ariel's daughter, Melody, who longs to be a part of the ocean world. A direct-to-video prequel, titled The Little Mermaid: Ariel's Beginning, was released in 2008. The story is set before the events of the original film, in which King Triton has banned music from Atlantica.

Other media

Television
A prequel animated series based on the film premiered in late 1992 on the CBS television network, following Ariel's adventures before the events of the film.

Live-action film adaptation

In May 2016, Deadline Hollywood reported that Disney was in early development for a live-action adaptation of the film directed by Rob Marshall, with a screenplay by David Magee and Jane Goldman, and a story written by Magee, Marshall, and John DeLuca. Alan Menken will return as the film's composer and write new songs alongside Lin-Manuel Miranda, who will also co-produce the film with Marc Platt, Marshall, and DeLuca. Halle Bailey will star as Ariel along with Jonah Hauer-King, Javier Bardem and Melissa McCarthy, with Daveed Diggs, Jacob Tremblay, and Awkwafina in voice roles. Filming wrapped on July 11, 2021. and the film is scheduled to be released on May 26, 2023.

The Little Mermaid Live!

The Wonderful World of Disney: The Little Mermaid Live was set to air on October 3, 2017, and would have featured a broadcast of the film with a similar format to the Hollywood Bowl concerts. However, on August 3, 2017, it was announced that the special had been dropped due to budget issues. The project was revived to commemorate the 30th anniversary of the film's original release, and was aired on November 5, 2019. Auliʻi Cravalho, Queen Latifah and Shaggy starred as Ariel, Ursula and Sebastian, respectively. Other cast members included John Stamos as Chef Louis and Graham Phillips as Prince Eric. The special featured performances of songs from the film and its Broadway adaptations in a themed "dive-in theater" setting at the Disney lot, accompanied by the film itself. It was produced by Done and Dusted, with director-executive producer Hamish Hamilton. In addition to marking the film's anniversary, the special was also used as a pre-launch promotional push for the new Disney+ streaming service, which was launched on November 12, 2019.

See also
 The Little Mermaid (franchise)
 Mermaids in popular culture
 List of Disney theatrical animated feature films
 List of Disney animated films based on fairy tales

References

External links

 
 
 
 
 

The Little Mermaid (franchise)
1989 animated films
1989 films
1980s American animated films
1980s adventure comedy films
1980s fantasy comedy films
1980s musical comedy films
American animated feature films
American children's animated adventure films
American children's animated comedy films
American children's animated fantasy films
American fantasy adventure films
American fantasy comedy films
American musical fantasy films
American children's animated musical films
American coming-of-age films
American romantic fantasy films
American romantic musical films
Animated coming-of-age films
Animated films about fish
Animated films about friendship
Animated romance films
Animated teen films
Disney controversies
Disney Renaissance
Film controversies
1980s English-language films
Films scored by Alan Menken
Films about prejudice
Films about princesses
Animated films about shapeshifting
Films about wish fulfillment
Films about witchcraft
Films about weddings
Films adapted into plays
Films based on The Little Mermaid
Films directed by John Musker
Films directed by Ron Clements
Films set in the 19th century
Films set in castles
Films set in a fictional country
Films that won the Best Original Score Academy Award
Films that won the Best Original Song Academy Award
Films with screenplays by Howard Ashman
Films with screenplays by John Musker
Films with screenplays by Ron Clements
Obscenity controversies in animation
Obscenity controversies in film
Walt Disney Animation Studios films
Walt Disney Pictures animated films
1980s children's animated films
3D re-releases
Films adapted into comics
Films adapted into television shows
Films produced by John Musker
Fiction about animal cruelty
Disney Princess films
Films about father–daughter relationships
United States National Film Registry films
Films about mermaids